Arthur Edward Spector (nicknamed "Speed"; 17 October 1920 – 18 June 1987) was an American basketball player. He played as a forward for the Boston Celtics from 1946 to 1950.

Biography
Spector was born in Philadelphia, Pennsylvania, and West Philadelphia was his hometown. He was Jewish. His grandson is American former soccer player Jonathan Spector. 

Spector attended and played basketball first at West Philadelphia High School where he was team captain. He then played basketball at Villanova University, from which he graduated in 1941. 

He was the first player ever to be signed by the Boston Celtics. Later, he was a scout for the Celtics. He played as a forward for the Celtics from 1946 to 1950.

He lived later in Newtown, Connecticut.

BAA/NBA career statistics

Regular season

Playoffs

References

External links
Profile at NBA.com

1920 births
1987 deaths
Boston Celtics assistant coaches
Boston Celtics players
Forwards (basketball)
Jewish men's basketball players
Villanova Wildcats men's basketball players
American men's basketball players
Basketball players from Philadelphia
West Philadelphia High School alumni